That's My Job is a Philippine television program aired over ABC. The program aired from July 5, 2008 to August 2, 2008 due to ABC-5's farewell broadcasts before converting and reformatting to TV5.

Hosts
Isko Moreno
Karen Agustin

See also
List of programs aired by TV5 (Philippine TV network)

References

TV5 (Philippine TV network) original programming
2008 Philippine television series debuts
2008 Philippine television series endings
Philippine television shows
Filipino-language television shows